Greenwich Village is a 1944 American comedy-drama musical film from Twentieth Century Fox directed by Walter Lang. It stars Carmen Miranda and Don Ameche.

Plot 
In 1922, aspiring composer Kenneth Harvey travels from the Midwest to Greenwich Village, New York, where he hopes to interest famed composer Kavosky in his concerto. Kenneth wanders into a speakeasy owned by the brash Danny O'Hare, who wants to put on a musical extravaganza showcasing his singing sweetheart, Bonnie Watson. Danny hopes that the show will make Bonnie a star and make up for the fact that he cost her an opportunity of playing a leading role for Ziegfeld. Danny's other main entertainer, Princess Querida, mistakenly assumes that Kenneth is rich, although the few hundred-dollar bills he innocently flashes are the extent of his traveling money. Danny immediately targets Kenneth as a chump and begins to get friendly with him, but Bonnie disapproves and allows Kenneth to escort her home. At her apartment, Bonnie confesses that when she came to Greenwich Village, she had aspirations to become a poet, and advises Kenneth to be more careful about displaying his money. Danny, jealous of Kenneth and Bonnie's obvious attraction to each other, brings the gang up to Bonnie's apartment for a party, and Kenneth plays some of his concerto for them.

The next morning, Danny arranges for Kenneth to move to the top floor apartment and begin writing songs for their show, although Bonnie stipulates that music from Kenneth's concerto must be withdrawn from the show if Kavosky likes it. Meanwhile, Hofer, a former violinist with Kavosky's orchestra, persuades the maestro to hear Kenneth play, which Kavosky reluctantly does to get rid of Hofer. Hofer then lies to Kenneth, telling him that Kavosky wants to perform his concerto at Carnegie Hall, and that they should begin the orchestrations immediately. Kenneth works hard on his music, which he withdraws from Danny's show, even though Bonnie has already written the lyrics. Danny is infuriated, especially when he sees Bonnie and Kenneth kiss, but Bonnie is thrilled by Kenneth's seeming good fortune. Unknown to Bonnie, Danny, who continues to rehearse the numbers using Kenneth's music, is aware of the situation when Hofer swindles Danny out of his life savings, which Hofer says is the down payment on the musicians' wages for the Carnegie Hall performance. Hofer disappears with the money, and Kenneth discovers his treachery after speaking to the surprised Kavosky.

The heartbroken Kenneth is on his way home when he sees Hofer returning the money to Danny, who has realized that Bonnie is truly in love with Kenneth. The young composer misunderstands the situation and assumes that Danny and Bonnie were in on the swindle. While Kenneth is angrily packing, Querida questions him and learns of his misapprehension. She then gets him arrested by giving him some bootleg liquor to carry, and while Kenneth languishes in jail, Danny, Bonnie and the others step up their rehearsals and prepare to open the show. On opening night, Danny's right-hand man, Brophy, bails Kenneth out of jail, and the irate composer rushes over to the theater to confront Danny. As he watches from the audience, Kenneth is amazed to see Kavosky conduct his concerto, which has been turned into an elaborate number featuring Querida and Bonnie. Kenneth rushes backstage, where Danny reveals that Kavosky volunteered his services after learning of the swindle perpetrated by Hofer. Danny also advises Kenneth to make up with Bonnie, and after her final number, Kenneth embraces her in the wings.

Cast
Carmen Miranda as Princess Quereda O'Toole
Don Ameche as Kenneth Harvey
William Bendix as Danny O'Mara
Vivian Blaine as Bonnie Watson
Felix Bressart as Hofer
The Four Step Brothers as Themselves

Production

Information in the Twentieth Century-Fox Produced Scripts Collection, located at the UCLA Arts, indicates that Robert Ellis, Helen Logan and Valentine Davies worked on early versions of the screenplay for this picture. Their contribution to the completed film is doubtful, however.

According to news published by The Hollywood Reporter in 29 October 1942, Alice Faye and Phil Regan were originally scheduled to star in the picture. Other actors announced by The Hollywood Reporter as having been cast included Ronald Graham, Jack Oakie (who was to play "Danny O'Mara" according to studio records), Phil Baker and Perry Como (who was to make his debut in the picture).

In July 1943, The Hollywood Reporter also reported that Lillian Porter had been cast in the film, but her appearance in the completed picture has not been confirmed. Although the onscreen credits introduce actress Vivian Blaine "in Her First Featured Role," Blaine had appeared in several previous productions for Twentieth Century-Fox, including a starring role in the 1943 film Jitterbugs. According to an item published by The Hollywood Reporter on 2 November 1943, the studio placed Blaine into Greenwich Village after showing two theater audiences a test reel of Technicolor footage of Blaine, Gale Robbins, Faye Marlowe, Lois Andrews and Doris Merrick, then asking the audiences to choose their favorite.
       
The picture marked the screen debut of The Revuers, a cabaret group featuring Judy Holliday (who is billed as Judith Tuvim on the CBCS), Betty Comden, Adolph Green and Alvin Hammer. Although news published by The Hollywood Reporter indicated that The Revuers' "satiric sketch of a Shubert operetta" had been purchased by the studio for their debut, the sequence was cut from the finished picture, and modern sources note that the group appears only in the party scene at "Bonnie Watson's" apartment. After the group broke up, Holliday became a well-known Broadway and motion picture comedian and won an Academy Award for Best Actress for Born Yesterday. Comden and Green became a popular songwriting team whose films included Singin' in the Rain and On the Town. Actor Felix Bressart was borrowed from MGM for the production.
       
According to information in the film's file in the MPAA/PCA Collection at the AMPAS Library, the Production Code Administration initially rejected the screenplay due to "sustained scenes of excessive and unnecessary drinking and drunkenness." A news published by The Hollywood Reporter in November 1942 noted that songwriter Leo Robin was teamed with Nacio Herb Brown to compose the film's songs after Robin's longtime collaborator, Ralph Rainger, died in a plane crash on 23 October 1942.

In a 27 October 1943 The Hollywood Reporter news item listing songs that were to be included in the film, the Robin and Brown songs "I'm Down to My Last Dream," "You Make Me Mad," "Oh, Brother," "Never Before," "That Thing They Sing About," "I've Been Smiling in My Sleep" and "I Have to See You Privately" were mentioned, but none of these titles were in the completed picture. Carmen Miranda's rendition of "Give Me a Band and a Bandana" includes excerpts from "O Que e que a baiana tem?" by Dorival Caymmi and "Quando eu penso na baia" by Ary Barroso.

Critical reception

"Technicolor is the picture's chief asset," said The New York Times of Greenwich Village, a Fox musical from a decidedly lesser tier than the studio's great "A" productions, but still worth a look for the presence of Carmen Miranda and, yes, Leon Shamroy's Technicolor cinematography.

Peggy Simmonds wrote in a review for The Miami News, "Fortunately for Greenwich Village, the picture is made in Technicolor and has Carmen Miranda. Unfortunately for Carmen Miranda, the production doesn't do her justice (...) the overall effect is disappointing (...) but still she sparkles the picture whenever she appears."

Time'''s review complained that the cast was hardly formidable enough to sustain a movie with such thin plot and characters. Bendix had recently become a star supporting player and had already perfected a screen persona of a lovable doofus. Time magazine's review of Greenwich Village marveled at how the persona was just that; in real life, apparently, Bendix was cultivated and mannered. "Bendix is probably the world's highest-paid professional ignoramus," said Time. "As such he now rates star billing at his studio and makes more money than the President of the U.S."

Vivian Blaine was touted as a newcomer by the Fox publicity machine, but in truth she had already been credited in four previous films, including Jitterbugs (1943), in which she played a significant role opposite Laurel and Hardy.

Carmen Miranda, on the other hand, who here sings "Give Me a Band and a Bandana," was still at the peak of her popularity, with Greenwich Village coming hot on the heels of her best and most famous film, The Gang's All Here'' (1943). Film historian Jeanine Basinger has written astutely that the Brazilian bombshell "wasn't a real movie star, but someone who did star turns in movies...She was an important escape fantasy of World War II." Known for her insanely over-the-top costumes, elaborate, fruit-laden headpieces, and hugely energetic singing and dancing, Carmen Miranda was always exaggerated to a delightful level.

DVD release 
The film was released on DVD in June 2008 as part of Fox's "The Carmen Miranda Collection."

See also
List of American films of 1944

References

External links

1944 films
1944 musical comedy films
1940s American films
1940s English-language films
20th Century Fox films
American musical comedy films
Films about composers
Films directed by Walter Lang
Films set in 1922
Films set in Manhattan